Echinops giganteus is a species of plant in the family Asteraceae and is native to Nigeria, Ethiopia and Tanzania.

References

giganteus
Flora of Africa